Alessandra Picagevicz (born 20 February 1984) is a Brazilian racewalker. She competed in the women's 20 kilometres walk at the 2004 Summer Olympics.

References

1984 births
Living people
Athletes (track and field) at the 2004 Summer Olympics
Brazilian female racewalkers
Olympic athletes of Brazil
Place of birth missing (living people)
South American Games gold medalists for Brazil
South American Games medalists in athletics
Competitors at the 2002 South American Games
21st-century Brazilian women